Arthur George Lee (31 August, 1849, Chelsea – 11 July 1925, Paddington) was an English first-class cricketer and clergyman.

The son of John Benjamin Lee, he was born in August 1849 at Chelsea. He was educated at Westminster School, where he was coached in cricket by Thomas Hearne. From Westminster he went up to University College, Oxford, where he matriculated in 1868. He graduated B.A. in 1872, and M.A. in 1877. While studying at Oxford, he played first-class cricket for Oxford University Cricket Club on four occasions between 1868 and 1871, scoring 22 runs with a high score of 16 not out. After graduating from Oxford, Lee took holy orders in the Church of England. His first ecclesiastical post was as vicar of Chippenham in Cambridgeshire from 1878 to 1886, after which he served as the rector of Langham, Suffolk. He died at Paddington in July 1925.

References

External links

1849 births
1925 deaths
19th-century English Anglican priests
20th-century English Anglican priests
Alumni of University College, Oxford
Cricketers from Chelsea, London
English cricketers
Oxford University cricketers
People educated at Westminster School, London